Ivan Sergeyevich Kalchuk (born 8 May 1991) is a former Russian professional football player.

Club career
He made his Russian Football National League debut for FC SKA-Energiya Khabarovsk on 15 May 2012 in a game against FC Torpedo Vladimir.

External links
 
 
 Career summary at sportbox.ru

1991 births
Living people
Russian footballers
Association football defenders
FC SKA-Khabarovsk players
FC Sever Murmansk players